The men's hammer throw event at the 2003 European Athletics U23 Championships was held in Bydgoszcz, Poland, at Zawisza Stadion on 19 July.

Medalists

Results

Final
19 July

Participation
According to an unofficial count, 11 athletes from 8 countries participated in the event.

 (2)
 (2)
 (2)
 (1)
 (1)
 (1)
 (1)
 (1)

References

Hammer throw
Hammer throw at the European Athletics U23 Championships